Sander Dekker (born 9 February 1975) is a Dutch politician who served as Minister for Legal Protection in the Third Rutte cabinet from 2017 to 2022. A member of the People's Party for Freedom and Democracy (VVD), he previously served as State Secretary for Education, Culture and Science under the Second Rutte cabinet from 2012 to 2017.

Biography

Early life
Dekker was born in The Hague. He went to primary and secondary school in Zoetermeer. He studied public administration at Leiden University (1993–1999). After his studies, Dekker worked as a researcher and teacher at Leiden University, most notably on matters of police and justice. In 2001, he was a visiting researcher at the University of Oxford Centre for European Politics, Economics and Society.

Politics
Dekker served as State Secretary at the Ministry of Education, Culture and Science under the Second Rutte cabinet, dealing with higher education, science and knowledge, teachers and culture, between 5 November 2012 and 26 October 2017. He previously served as a municipal councillor in The Hague from 2003 to 2006, party group leader in the municipal council from 2004 to 2006 and an alderman in the municipal executive from 2006 to 2012. He was responsible for Education, Youth and Sports until 2010 and Finance from 2010 to 2012.

In July 2015, Dekker submitted to the States General a proposal to change two aspects of the freedom of education law:
 Not to demand that new schools represent an ideological direction, such as a religion. New schools could be based on an idea for good education, for instance IT-based education, green schools, or other innovative concept, as long as sufficient interest exists for such a system.
 To introduce more severe quality controls. Freedom of education should not be a license for bad educational systems.

On 26 October 2017, he was appointed Minister for Legal Protection, a ministership without portfolio at the Ministry of Justice and Security, in charge of Privacy Policy, Youth Justice, Copyright Law and Prevention, under Minister Ferdinand Grapperhaus. On 10 January 2022, he was succeeded by Franc Weerwind.

References

External links

Official
  Drs. S. (Sander) Dekker Parlement & Politiek

1975 births
Living people
Aldermen of The Hague
Dutch expatriates in England
Dutch jurists
Fellows of St Antony's College, Oxford
Leiden University alumni
Academic staff of Leiden University
Members of the House of Representatives (Netherlands)
Ministers without portfolio of the Netherlands
Municipal councillors of The Hague
People's Party for Freedom and Democracy politicians
State Secretaries for Education of the Netherlands
21st-century Dutch civil servants
21st-century Dutch educators
21st-century Dutch politicians